Skolelinux/Debian-Edu is a Linux distribution intended for educational use and a Debian Pure Blend. The free and open source software project was founded in Norway in 2001 and is now being internationally developed. Its name is a direct translation of "school linux" from Norwegian, skole being derived from the Latin word schola.

Design and principles
Skolelinux offers four different installation profiles on one compact disk that will easily install a pre-configured educational network, including a main server, workstations and Thin client-servers. In short, its major goals are to:

 Create a Linux distribution tailored for schools based on their needs and resources.
 Simplify maintenance of computer facilities.
 Provide a thin client-solution, which eases maintenance, reduces costs and allows use of old hardware.
 Cut costs by using open source software and re-using old hardware.
 Identify and facilitate suitable programs for use in the schools.
 Enable teachers to provide high quality IT teaching to their students.
 Localize the IT infrastructure by translating the software pages to both official writing forms of Norwegian Bokmål and Nynorsk, as well as Northern Sami. This goal was later extended to reach out to all languages in schools around the world, however.

History
The Skolelinux project was started on July 2, 2001. Twenty-five computer programmers and translators agreed to improve the use of software in education. They disliked that the next generation of computer users were not able to have access to source code, arguing that children who are interested should be able to learn from expert programmers to create their own software. Other developers, especially the translators, were interested in providing computer programs in the students' native languages. These developers thought that students should be able to navigate the internet by having "road signs" they would understand.

The Skolelinux project was associated with the member organisation "Linux in schools", which was founded on July 16, 2001. "Linux in schools" later changed its name to "Free Software in Schools" by the annual meeting on October 16, 2004. German teachers, developers and translators joined Skolelinux throughout 2002. In 2003, Skolelinux was included step-by-step as a standard part of Debian.

Since 2003, many developers from around the world have joined the project, with developers in France, Greece and Germany being the most active. The Skolelinux project also cooperates with many other free educational software projects such as LTSP, gnuLinEx, Edubuntu, K12LTSP, KDE, Gnome, Firefox and OpenOffice.org. Similar organisations have also been established in Spain, Germany, Latvia, France, Brasil and Denmark.

Skolelinux has been a major contributor to rewriting the Debian-Installer. In addition, Skolelinux has conducted extensive development and testing of thin clients and diskless workstations as a part of the new LTSP version 5.

A total of 214 schools using Skolelinux. This case study of implementing Skolelinux at a school in Greece is typical of user experiences.

Releases

Funding
Skolelinux development is sponsored by the SLX Debian Labs Foundation on a yearly basis. The Norwegian Ministry of Education and The Ministry of Reform and Administration has sponsored the project. Also private donors and companies have provided sponsorship. This helps organize 7–10 developer gatherings annually in Norway, Spain and Germany.

See also

 Comparison of Linux distributions
 List of Linux distributions

References

External links
 
 
 Debian Edu/Skolelinux Project Wiki
 Debian Edu/Skolelinux project press coverage list

Linux Terminal Server Project
Debian-based distributions
Language-specific Linux distributions
Educational operating systems
Free educational software
Linux distributions